Mannerim is a semi-rural locality on the Bellarine Peninsula of Victoria, Australia.

Characterised by hobby farms and wineries, it is centred on the Grubb Road-Bellarine Highway intersection.

History
The Post Office opened on 15 June 1893 and closed in 1975.

From 1914 to 1920, it was the location of a training camp for covert operations infantry for the war in Europe.

References

Towns in Victoria (Australia)
Bellarine Peninsula
Suburbs of Geelong